Carmel High School (CHS) is a public high school in Carmel, Indiana, United States, and part of the Carmel Clay Schools District.

Demographics
The demographic breakdown of the 5,414 students enrolled for the 2020–2021 school year was: 
Male - 49.9%
Female - 50.1%
Native American/Alaskan - 0.1%
Asian - 14.3%
Black - 3.8%
Hispanic - 3.6%
Native Hawaiian/Pacific islanders - 0.3%
White - 71.5%
Multiracial - 6.4%
17.9% of the students were eligible for free or reduced-price lunch. For the 2020–2021 school year, Carmel was a Title I school.

Athletics
Carmel's Greyhounds started competing as an Independent starting in the spring of 2022, formerly competing in the Metropolitan Interscholastic Conference. School colors are blue and gold.

As of the 2019–2020 school year, the following Indiana High School Athletic Association (IHSAA) sanctioned sports were offered:

Baseball (boys) 
Basketball (girls and boys) 
Cross country (girls and boys) 
Football (boys) 
Lacrosse (girls and boys - Varsity Sport - IHSLA sanctioned)
Golf (girls and boys) 
Soccer (girls and boys) 
Softball (girls) 
Rugby (girls)
Swimming and diving (girls and boys) 
Tennis (girls and boys) 
Track and field (girls and boys) 
Unified flag football (coed) 
Unified track and field (coed) 
Volleyball (girls) 
Wrestling (boys)

Athletic State Championships 
Carmel is known for their Athletic Success. They have 169 IHSAA state championships, the most of any school. They have the IHSAA record for most state titles in the same academic year with 7 in 2011–2012, 2016–2017, 2018–2019, and 2020–2021. They also have both the IHSAA and national record for most consecutive state championships in any sport by winning the Indiana Girls Swimming & Diving State Championships 37 times from 1987 to 2023.At the 2023 IHSAA Boys Swimming & Diving State Championships the Greyhounds broke the NFHS record in the 200 medley relay with a time of 1:26.88.

Arts 
The Carmel High School marching band were Indiana State Fair Band Day champions in 1984 and ISSMA State Champions in 1990, 2001, 2002, 2012, 2018, and 2022. The band was named BOA National Class AAA Champion in 2001. The band was named BOA Grand National Champion in 2005, 2012, 2016, 2017, 2018, and 2022.

The Carmel High School Marching Greyhounds were invited to perform in the 2004 London New Year's Parade in London, England.

In 2007, the band was invited to play on the USS Missouri, along with the Hawaii's Royal Band. In 2007, the marching band was named Bands of America Regional Champion in Indianapolis and Atlanta, GA.

At the 2008 BOA Grand National Finals, the marching band won the caption for best music. Later, the marching band was selected to play in the 2011 Macy's Thanksgiving Day Parade, alongside numerous celebrities, floats, and a few other choice bands.

The band has also received an invitation to play in the 2014 Tournament of Roses Parade, in Pasadena, California.

In 2016, the Carmel High School Marching Band set a record as the first group to ever tie for first place at the Bands of America Grand National Championships with a score of 97.45. Carmel won the tiebreaker to Avon High School (IN) and was crowned Grand National Champion. In 1999, 2013, 2015, 2017, and 2018, Carmel won the Indiana State School Music Association State Championship.

Journalism 
The Pinnacle yearbook has received recognition from the Columbia Scholastic Press Association, National Scholastic Press Association, and the Indiana High School Press Association. Additionally, the publication has received the Gold Crown award, Indiana Hoosier Star Awards, and has been placed in the Walsworth Publishing Company's Gallery of Excellence. The publication is one of the largest in the United States, publishing approximately 500 pages with a staff of 50 students. It operates an independent website.

The school newspaper, the HiLite, has received national recognition, including a "Superior" rating from Quill & Scroll, the Hoosier Star award, and other general awards from the Indiana High School Press Association, Columbia Scholastic Press Association (CSPA), as well as several individual awards for HiLite staff members. The HiLite was a gold medalist in the CSPA's annual critique, won a George H. Gallup Award from Quill and Scroll, and has been nominated to be a CSPA Crown finalist for the 2011–2012 publications. The newspaper maintains a staff of about 80 students.

The school operates the WHJE radio station on 91.3 MHz on the FM band. In 1999, WIRE, a local station which broadcasts on 91.5 MHz, proposed moving its broadcasting antenna closer to the school. When the school filed an FCC petition in opposition to the proposed antenna move, WIRE filed a response alleging that WHJE broadcasts music with indecent lyrics.

The school Television Station, CHTV: Carmel Television operates on Channel 99 on cable television.

History
The Carmel/Clay Township area was settled by Quakers in the early 1830s. In 1833, a meeting house was constructed on a hill where the older Carmel Cemetery sits today. It was common practice well into the 20th century for Quakers to give names to their meeting places. Benjamin Mendenhall suggested the name Richland for the new meeting. The same year a school was started in the meeting house and, in 1835, the log structure was doubled in size. Throughout most of the 19th century, education in Carmel, like most of the nation, was provided by public elementary schools and private academies for post-8th grade education.
 
Richland School was replaced by a larger wood-frame structure a few years later. It sat on the northwest corner of Rangeline and Smoky Row Roads. In 1845, a frame school building was built near the same site. In 1867, the all-brick Carmel Academy was built on land where the Wesleyana Amistad Cristiana Church sits today. By 1887, the size and population of the community warranted a larger and more permanent structure, so on September 23, 1887, on a small hill on the east side of First Avenue SE and Fifth Street SE, the cornerstone of the first Carmel High School was laid. The two-story brick building would house grades one through ten with no frills – just classrooms. Because the town was founded on a boundary separating Clay and Delaware townships, the school was administered jointly by trustees of both. This new Carmel High School was opened in 1888 with its first graduating class in 1890. The first class to receive four years of education graduated in 1901.
 
In 1921, land was purchased on the east side of Carmel proper and a new school was designed to house grades one through twelve. This facility would contain a gymnasium, a library, and a 600-seat auditorium. Local citizens decided in 1955 that the community needed to organize a school district headed by a superintendent. Forest Stoops, the county superintendent, was hired and the state legislature was persuaded to move the township boundary east to White River. Carmel Clay Schools then began in 1956. By 1958, Carmel High School was opened at its present location. An addition was added to the gymnasium in 1961 and a large addition including a swimming pool, an auditorium, and new classrooms opened in 1969. A third, freestanding addition was opened in 1977 located between the 1921 building (affectionately known as Old North) and the new Carmel High School. A final construction project was begun in 1990 and dedicated in April 1999. In 2006, the CHS Freshman Center was opened to allow incoming freshmen to acclimate to high school life and adapt to the size of the building. Today, Carmel High School sits on 55 acres of land and 22 are under roof.

Viral TikTok 

On February 8, 2023, the school's DECA team posted a TikTok featuring a tour of the campus, which was followed by a part two the next day on February 9. The videos, which showcased various amenities at the school, including an on-campus bookstore, an auto shop, an Esports room, a jewelry room, a 10,000 seat football stadium, a market, radio, and planetarium, amongst other features, received a combined total of 34 million views on TikTok and versions posted to Twitter. 

The videos drew attention for the school's peculiar and grand structures and amenities that are either downsized or absent in the vast majority of schools in the United States. This sparked a myriad of responses from alumni of other schools, particularly those from poorer areas and starting a discussion regarding the United States' education system and spending in the system. The debate was further inflamed by the racial demographics of the school, which is majority white, leading to many pointing to this being an issue of racial inequities. Critics decried the stark difference between Carmel High School and schools in poor-income areas, which was often blamed on the supposed greater funding towards schools like Carmel; this claim was debunked as Carmel in reality receives less funding than many schools in poor-income areas, leading to the counterpoint that this was an issue of how funds were spent.

Tim Phares, CHS principal, claimed that the incident was an entertaining but educational experience, adding that "[W]e are excited they seemingly hit the jackpot with millions of people viewing the tour of our exceptional school. Like with much of social media, they have also witnessed some negativity and the experience has provided multiple lessons about being online." The comments on the video have since been disabled.

Notable alumni 

 Ted Allen – television personality
 Jeff Anderson – tuba player
 Rich Balchan – soccer player
 Nate Becker – football tight end
 Amy Bilquist – competitive swimmer
 David Broecker – life sciences executive
 Haste the Day – Christian metalcore band
 Mike Delph – politician and former member of the Indiana Senate
 Stu Douglass – basketball player
 Keeley Dowling – soccer defender
 Matt Elliott – football offensive lineman
 A. J. Hammons – former professional basketball player
 Matt Hedges – soccer player
 Mark Herrmann – former football quarterback
 Steve Inskeep – journalist
 Drew Kibler – Olympic swimmer
 Kyle Lloyd – baseball player
 Jake Lloyd – former actor
 Josh McRoberts – former professional basketball player
 Jake Mitchell – Olympic swimmer
 Morgan Newton – former football quarterback and tight end
 Tommy O'Haver – film and television director
 Rajeev Ram – tennis player
 Austin Roberts – former football tight end
 Billy Shepherd – former basketball player
 Avriel Shull – architect
 Sage Steele – television anchor
 Collin Taylor – football wide receiver
 Danielle Trotta – sportscaster
 Todd Young – United States Senator

See also 

 List of high schools in Indiana

References

External links 

Public high schools in Indiana
1869 establishments in Indiana
Schools in Hamilton County, Indiana
Carmel, Indiana
Educational institutions established in 1869
Articles containing video clips